Hampton College could refer to:
Hampton College (Durban, South Africa)
Hampton College, Peterborough 
Hampton University (historically called "Hampton Normal and Agricultural Institute" and "Hampton Institute") in Hampton, Virginia